Stefan Tewes (born 24 November 1967 in Mülheim an der Ruhr, Nordrhein-Westfalen) is a former field hockey player from Germany, who won the gold medal with the Men's National Team at the 1992 Summer Olympics in Barcelona, Spain. His younger brother Jan-Peter (born  1968) was also on that winning side.

See also
Coffee Fellows

References
 databaseOlympics
 sports-reference

External links
 

1967 births
Living people
Field hockey players at the 1992 Summer Olympics
German male field hockey players
Olympic field hockey players of Germany
Olympic gold medalists for Germany
Place of birth missing (living people)
Olympic medalists in field hockey
People educated at Bedford School
Medalists at the 1992 Summer Olympics
20th-century German people